Ibrahim Andres Ogoulola (born 3 February 2000) is a Beninese international footballer who plays for Requins de l'Atlantique, as a midfielder.

International career

International goals
Scores and results list Benin's goal tally first.

References

2000 births
Living people
Beninese footballers
Benin international footballers
Requins de l'Atlantique FC players
Energie FC players
Association football midfielders